Santosh Kumar Sahani, is a music director, composer and singer in Nepal music industry  and Bhojpuri Film / Music Industry. He was born 24 August 1990 at Sarabe Tol, Kamala Municipality-2, Dhanusha, Nepal.

Career 
He has composed more than 400 music including Maithili, Bhojpuri, Nepali and Hindi songs for more than 10 years. Credited as Santosh Raj he is founder of Sraj Productions Pvt. Ltd., Kathmandu and Sraj foundation a non-profit organization in Nepal. He has composed more than a dozen Nepali film songs. He has created jingles for NTV, Swar Sangram Reality show, College Ideal, Well Dance Reality Show in Nepal.

He has been music director in some Nepali films like Tori Laure, Nefte etc., some Hindi films like Na Jane Kyun, The Railway Track etc. and some Bhojpuri films like Yudha Bhumi, Tahalka, Bagalbali Aakha mare etc. He is an awarded person who has received OS Nepal Music Award 2074 for Best Singer for the song Gaam Baali Kaniya a Bhojpuri Song. He has been honored from various organizations in Nepal.

References

External links 
 Official Website

Living people
1990 births
21st-century Nepalese male singers
People from Dhanusha District